The 1989–90 SM-liiga season was the 15th season of the SM-liiga, the top level of ice hockey in Finland. 12 teams participated in the league, and TPS Turku won the championship.

Standings

Playoffs

Quarterfinals
 JyP HT - Tappara 1:2 (8:1, 3:4, 1:5)
 HIFK - KalPa 0:2 (3:4, 0:4)

Semifinals
 TPS - KalPa 3:0 (3:1, 6:5 P, 5:1)
 Ilves - Tappara 3:0 (5:4, 5:4, 6:3)

3rd place
 Tappara - KalPa 5:3

Final
 TPS - Ilves 4:2 (1:4, 4:1, 2:3, 7:0, 5:3, 6:3)

Relegation
 KooKoo - Hockey-Reipas 1:3 (4:1, 2:8, 6:7, 1:6)
 Ässät Pori - JoKP 3:0 (3:2, 5:4, 9:4)

External links
 SM-liiga official website

1989–90 in Finnish ice hockey
Fin
Liiga seasons